The State of Malerkotla or Maler Kotla was a princely state in the Punjab region during the era of British India. The last Nawab of Maler Kotla signed the instrument of accession to join the Dominion of India on 20 August 1948. Its rulers belonged to a Sarwani and Lodi Pashtun dynasty from Afghanistan, and its capital was in Malerkotla. The state belonged to the Punjab States Agency.

History

The area, which was known as Maler, was received as a jagir in 1454 A.D. by Sheikh Sadruddin-i-Jahan, a pious man of the Sherwani tribe of Afghanistan area, and was ruled by his descendants.

Local tradition says that Bahlul Lodi (1451–1489), the Afghan king who had most of western India under his control, desired to rule Delhi and on his way, he was caught in a sand drift. In the darkness the King spotted a dim light of a lamp still burning in the wind. It was the hut of Sheikh Sadruddin and when the king found out he came to the hut to show his respect and asked the holy man to pray for him to bear a son and have victory. During 1451 and 1452, the king married off his daughter Taj Murassa to Sheikh Sadruddin after being enthroned in Delhi, and also gave him the area of Maler as a jagir.

The descendants of Sheikh Sadruddin branched into two groups. One started ruling the state and were given the title of Nawab when the Mughal Empire arose. The other branch lived around the Shrine of Shaikh Sadruddin, controlling its revenue from pilgrims.

The State of Malerkotla was established in 1657 by Bayazid Khan. After saving the life of Mughal Emperor Aurangzeb in a tiger attack, Bayazid Khan was granted the privilege to build a fort, which he named Malerkotla and eventually gave its name to the state. On 3 May 1809 Maler Kotla became a British protectorate and was made part of the Cis-Sutlej states until 1862. Malerkotla ranked 12th in the Punjab Darbar in 1890. During the 1947 riots when Punjab was in flames, the State of Malerkotla did not witness a single incident of violence; through it all, it remained a lone island of peace.

The roots of communal harmony in the area date back to 1705, when Fateh Singh and Zorawar Singh, the 9- and 7-year-old sons of 10th Sikh Guru, Guru Gobind Singh, were ordered to be bricked alive by the governor of Sirhind, Wazir Khan. His close relative, Sher Mohammed Khan, Nawab of Malerkotla, who was present in the court, lodged a vehement protest against this inhuman act and said it was against the teachings of Islam. Wazir Khan nevertheless had the boys bricked into a section of wall while still alive. At this, the Nawab of Malerkotla walked out of the court in protest. Guru Gobind Singh on learning this approach profusely thanked the Nawab of Malerkotla and blessed him with his hukamnama and kirpan. Banda Singh Bahadur's avoidance of attacking Malerkotla has been attributed to the actions of Sher Mohammed Khan, however J.S. Grewal notes that Banda's passivity towards the state was due to his prescribed route taking him elsewhere. Wars between Malerkotla state (originally siding with the Mughals, and later the forces of Ahmad Shah Abdali and the Rohilla Afghans, both of whom repeatedly raided Punjab during the eighteenth century) and the Sikh powers in Punjab resumed shortly after. Relations between the two oscillated during this period- involving events of intermittent warring as well as interventions of mutual defense against certain extra-local Sikh invaders. In 1795, Sahib Singh Bedi, a descendant of Guru Nanak, attacked Malerkotla, in part due to the issue of cow slaughter taking place in the city as well as other motivations influencing the expedition including the role of the nawab in the killing of a relative of Guru Gobind, as well as the contemporary nawab's ostensible role in the Vadda Ghallugura- a massacre in which twenty five thousand Sikhs were said to have been killed. His forces were stopped and repelled, with assistance coming from the rulers of Patiala. In 1808, Ranjit Singh, arrived at the town and demanded an extortionate tribute of one million rupees from the state. Upon the nawab's inability to accumulate this wealth, Ranjit Singh attacked, forcing the nawab to take loans from wealthier Sikh neighbors to pay the due. The nawab subsequently appealed to the British and shortly after ceded to British suzerainty. During the Partition of India, the State of Malerkotla experienced relatively insignificant communal violence due to the aforementioned objections of Sher Mohammed Khan to Wazir Khan's handling of Gobind Singh's sons. Many local people attribute this peaceful strain to the presence of the shrine of 'Baba Haidar Sheikh', the Sufi saint, who founded the town of Malerkotla more than 500 years ago.

The state was also under the suzeranity of Mahadaji Shinde.

Following Indian independence and the signing of the instrument of accession to the Dominion of India in 1948, Maler Kotla joined the newly established state of Patiala and East Punjab States Union (PEPSU) until its merger with Punjab in 1956.

List of Rulers

Chiefs

The chiefs were the holders of the jagir of Maler.

Rulers

The rulers were titled 'Nawab'. They had the right to an 11 gun salute.

Titular Rulers

Titular Holder

Demographics

Religion

See also

 Malerkotla
 Malerkotla district
 Punjab States Agency
 List of Sunni Muslim dynasties
 Patiala and East Punjab States Union

Notes

References

External links

Princely states of Punjab
Malerkotla district
Muslim princely states of India

1657 establishments in India
1948 disestablishments in India

fr:Maler Kotla